The house of Estienne is a French noble family from Provence. Its most illustrious member is Henri Honoré d'Estienne d'Orves, a French Navy officer, reputed "first martyr of Free France" and one of the major heroes of the French Resistance.

History and branches 
The house of Estienne is known since the 15th century.
The family is divided in four main genealogical branches:
 the Lords of Orves,
 the Lords of Saint-Jean,
 the Lords of Bourguet,
 the Lords of Villemus.

Notable members 
 Nicolas d'Estienne d'Orves (b. 1974), French journalist and writer.
 Honoré d’Estienne d’Orves (1901–1941), Navy officer and Second World War hero.
 Louis-Jules d'Estienne du Bourguet (1771–1834), officer, mayor of Aix-en-Provence from 1815 to 1830.
 Jean-Baptiste d'Estienne du Bourguet (1760–1821), Navy officer and mathematician.
 Thomas d'Estienne d'Orves (1727–1782), French admiral.
 François d'Estienne (1549–1593), Lord of Saint-Jean de la Salle and Montfuron, President of the Parliament of Provence.
 François d'Estienne de Saint-Jean de Prunières, last bishop of Grasse (from 1753 to 1790).

Coat of arms and motto 

 Mottos: Fluere desinet unquam; Folium non defluet unquam.
 Supporters: two golden griffins
 Crown: Marquis

Derived names
  also known as the A69 type, it is a class of French Navy avisos

References

French noble families